The 2019 WAC men's basketball tournament was the postseason men's basketball tournament for the Western Athletic Conference during the 2018–19 season. All tournament games were played at the Orleans Arena in Paradise, Nevada, from March 14–16, 2019. New Mexico State defeated Grand Canyon 89–57 in the championship to win the tournament, and received the conference's automatic bid to the 2019 NCAA tournament. The win was New Mexico State's WAC leading ninth championship, and seventh in the last eight seasons.

Seeds
8 of the 9 teams in the WAC were eligible to compete in the conference tournament. California Baptist is ineligible due to their transition from Division II to Division I. Teams were seeded by record within the conference, with a tiebreaker system to seed teams with identical conference records.

Schedule and results

Bracket

References

External links
2019 Western Athletic Conference Men's Basketball Championship

WAC men's basketball tournament
Tournament
WAC men's basketball tournament
WAC men's basketball tournament
Basketball competitions in the Las Vegas Valley
College basketball tournaments in Nevada
College sports tournaments in Nevada